The École Normale Hébraïque ("Jewish Normal School") is a Jewish secondary school in Casablanca, Morocco, opened in 1945. It regularly achieves 100% success rates in the national matriculation examinations, the best record in the country. In 2005 it had 138 students of whom 26 are French. It is a part of the AEFE school network. It serves the levels collège and lycée.

References

External links
 Alliance Israélite Universelle 
 Agence pour l'enseignement française à l'étranger 
 

Jewish schools in Morocco
Jews and Judaism in Casablanca
French international schools in Casablanca
Educational institutions established in 1945
1945 establishments in Morocco
20th-century architecture in Morocco